"Listen Up!" is a song by American indie rock band Gossip, released in July 2006 from their third studio album, Standing in the Way of Control (2006). It was re-released in 2007, peaking at number 39 on the UK Singles Chart during this second run.

The "Tronik Youth" remix was included on the nightclub Cream's compilation Cream Summer 2007.

Video
There are two versions of this music video. In the original version, directed by Morgen Dye, Beth Ditto is eating a pizza in response to jibes about her weight and several young people dancing to the track. In the 2007 version (billed as the radio version), a transgender woman and a transgender man walk around Portland, Oregon, cruising during the day, then later in the evening at a club the two stare at each other from across the dance floor and they start dancing together.

Track listings
UK CD single
 "Listen Up!" (Album version)
 "Listen Up!"
 "Listen Up!" (Tronik Youth remix)
 "Are You That Somebody"
 "Listen Up!" (Video)

UK 7-inch (2006)
 "Listen Up!"
 "Are You That Somebody"

UK 7-inch (2007)
 "Listen Up!" (Radio edit)
 "Listen Up!" (MSTRKRFT mix)

UK 7-inch picture disc (2007)
 "Listen Up!" (2007 version)
 "Listen Up!" (Live at the Astoria)

Personnel
 Beth Ditto – vocals
 Brace Paine – guitar, bass guitar
 Hannah Blilie – drums

Charts

References

2006 singles
2006 songs
2007 singles
Columbia Records singles
Gossip (band) songs
LGBT-related songs
Songs written by Beth Ditto
Songs written by Brace Paine
Songs written by Hannah Blilie